Robert Locke Ralston was a Democratic member of the Mississippi House of Representatives, representing Coahoma County, from 1916 to 1920.

Biography 
Robert Locke Ralston was born in Smyrna, Rutherford County, Tennessee, on February 12, 1860. He was the son of Robert Lock Ralston and Mary M. (Stephens) Ralston. The junior Robert was a farmer and a planter. He married Mary Elizabeth Shaw in 1891. On January 27, 1898, he was appointed the mayor of Coahoma, Mississippi, a position in which he served for 16 years. He was elected to the Mississippi House of Representatives as a Democrat to represent Coahoma County in November 1915, for the 1916–1920 term. Ralston died in Memphis, Tennessee, on April 3, 1926.

References 

1860 births
1926 deaths
People from Coahoma, Mississippi
People from Smyrna, Tennessee
Democratic Party members of the Mississippi House of Representatives